Algeria (ALG) competed at the 1993 Mediterranean Games in Languedoc-Roussillon, France.

Medal summary

Medal table

References

International Mediterranean Games Committee

Nations at the 1993 Mediterranean Games
1993
Mediterranean Games